Adam Larfi (born 27 May 1999), better known as Adam Noi, is an Algerian Muay Thai kickboxer.  He is also a former two-time IFMA Muay Thai World Champion in 2016 and 2019. Larfi is ranked #8 in the WBC Muaythai super lightweight rankings. He will fight for WBC Muay Thai Super lightweight world title.

Biography 
Noi was born in Saint-Denis, France to Algerian parents. Noi started exercising at the age of 10. He first practiced karate and judo but eventually turned to Muay Thai. He dropped out of school at the age of 14. He went to Thailand to learn Muay Thai and has lived there ever since. He fought in major Thai stadiums, including Lumpinee and Rajadamnern. Noi has two IFMA world titles and a European title. He is the current athlete of ONE Championship.

Noi also ranked in the WBC (World Boxing Council Muaythai). He was scheduled to fight with "Prince Junior" on November 7, 2020 for the Super Lightweight division of WMC (World Muaythai Council) World Championship. But the fight was postponed due to the COVID-19 pandemic.

Fight record

|-  style="background:#cfc;"
| 2023-03-04|| Win||align=left| Tompeng Haha  || Rajadamnern World Series || Bangkok, Thailand || Decision (Unanimous)|| 3 ||3:00
|-  style="background:#fbb;"
| 2022-02-12|| Loss||align=left| Nathan Bendon || University of Bolton Stadium || Bolton, England || Decision (Majority) ||5  ||3:00 
|-
! style=background:white colspan=9 |
|-  style="background:#cfc;"
| 2021-12-30|| Win ||align=left| Dansiam AyothayaFightGym || Petchyindee, Rangsit Stadium|| Rangsit, Thailand || Decision || 5 ||3:00 
|-  style="background:#cfc;"
|  2021-10-09 || Win || align="left" | Daraek RevolutionPhuketMuayThai|| Muay Hardcore ||  Thailand || Decision || 3 || 3:00
|-  style="background:#fbb;"
| 2021-02-26|| Loss ||align=left| Han Zihao || ONE Championship: Fists Of Fury 2|| Kallang, Singapore || Decision (Unanimous) || 3 || 3:00
|-  style="background:#cfc;"
| 2020-01-10|| Win ||align=left| Victor Pinto || ONE Championship: A New Tomorrow || Bangkok, Thailand || Decision (Unanimous) || 3 || 3:00
|-  style="background:#cfc;"
| 2019-11-30|| Win ||align=left| Ramesh Habib|| Rebellion Muay Thai XXIII || Melbourne, Australia || Decision || 3 || 3:00
|-  style="background:#cfc;"
| 2019-07-20|| Win ||align=left| Yodphotong Sor Sanpasamit || Muaythai Singpatong Saturday || Phuket, Thailand || KO (Right Elbow) || 1 ||
|-  style="background:#fbb;"
| 2019-06-18|| Loss ||align=left| Kompayak Teemuangloei || Petchnumnoi + Prestige Fight (Lumpinee) || Bangkok, Thailand || Decision || 5 || 3:00
|-  style="background:#fbb;"
| 2019-02-20|| Loss ||align=left| Antar Kacem || All Star Muay Thai || Paris, France || Decision || 3 || 3:00
|-  style="background:#c5d2ea;"
| 2019-01-27|| Draw ||align=left| Fapajak || Warriors Night || Courbevoie, France || Decision || 5 || 3:00
|-  style="background:#cfc;"
| 2018-12-15|| Win ||align=left| Jonathan Fabian || Top Team Fighters || Torre-Pacheco, Spain || Decision || 3 || 3:00
|-  style="background:#cfc;"
| 2018-11-09|| Win ||align=left| Anouar El Karkouri || Best Of Siam 14 || Paris, France || Decision || 3 || 3:00
|-  style="background:#cfc;"
| 2018-10-12|| Win ||align=left| Aiman Al Radhi|| All Star Muay-Thai || Aubervilliers, France || Decision || 3 || 3:00
|-  style="background:#cfc;"
| 2018-08-28|| Win ||align=left| Petburapha Sor.Sakulpong || Petch Numnoi + Street Fight (Lumpinee) || Bangkok, Thailand || KO || 4 ||
|-  style="background:#cfc;"
| 2018-05-05|| Win ||align=left| Petkaieko 13 Coins Gym || Warriors Night || Nanterre, France || Decision || 3 || 3:00
|-  style="background:#cfc;"
| 2018-03-24|| Win ||align=left| Remy || Lumpinee World Champion || Bangkok, Thailand || Decision || 5 || 3:00
|-  style="background:#cfc;"
| 2017-10-14|| Win ||align=left| Rehda Chtibi || Shock Muay 9 || Saint-Denis, France || Decision || 3 || 3:00
|-  style="background:#cfc;"
| 2017-09-24|| Win ||align=left| Petchsaimoon Kaaisansukgym || Max Muay Thai || Pattaya, Thailand || TKO (Right Push Kick) || 3 ||
|-  style="background:#fbb;"
| 2017-02-26|| Loss ||align=left| Jakchai Phetpotong || Suek Wangingtong (Rajadamnern) || Bangkok, Thailand || Decision || 5 || 3:00
|-  style="background:#c5d2ea;"
| 2017-01-13|| Draw ||align=left| Seuadam Kongsittha || Muay Xtreme || Bangkok, Thailand || Decision || 5 || 3:00
|-  style="background:#fbb;"
| 2016-09-21|| Loss ||align=left| Kaensuan Sasiprapa || Sasiprapa || Bangkok, Thailand || Decision || 5 || 3:00
|-  style="background:#fbb;"
| 2016-09-02|| Loss ||align=left| Jafar Petchsaman || Super Muaythai || Bangkok, Thailand || Decision || 5 || 3:00
|-  style="background:#cfc;"
| 2016-08-12|| Win ||align=left| Renan Cortes || Queen's Birthday || Bangkok, Thailand || KO (Right Spinning Elbow) || 4 ||
|-  style="background:#fbb;"
| 2016-07-31|| Loss ||align=left| Kaewta Banchamek|| Super Muaythai || Bangkok, Thailand || Decision || 5 || 3:00
|-  style="background:#cfc;"
| 2016-05-01|| Win ||align=left| Aguenehenai Amayas || Super Muaythai || Bangkok, Thailand || Decision || 5 || 3:00
|-  style="background:#cfc;"
| 2016-03-18|| Win ||align=left| Adia Sitmonchai || Wanweraphon (Lumpinee) || Bangkok, Thailand || TKO (Low Kicks) || 3 ||
|-
| colspan=9 | Legend:    

|-  style="background:#cfc;"
| 2019-07-28|| Win||align=left| Matas Pultarazinskas || IFMA World Championships 2019, Final || Bangkok, Thailand || Decision (30-27)|| 3 || 
|-
! style=background:white colspan=9 |
|-  style="background:#cfc;"
| 2019-07-27|| Win||align=left| Suchakhri Ruanthai || IFMA World Championships 2019, Semi Final || Bangkok, Thailand || Decision (29-28)|| 3 ||
|-  style="background:#cfc;"
| 2019-07-25|| Win||align=left| Mathieu Adrien || IFMA World Championships 2019, Quarter Final || Bangkok, Thailand || TKO (retirement)|| 1 ||
|-  style="background:#cfc;"
| 2016-05-27|| Win||align=left| Václav Sivák || IFMA World Championships 2016 U-18, Final || Jonkoping, Sweden || Decision (29-28)|| 3 || 
|-
! style=background:white colspan=9 |
|-  style="background:#cfc;"
| 2016-05-25|| Win||align=left| Islom Abdukarimov || IFMA World Championships 2016 U-18, Semi Final || Jonkoping, Sweden || Decision (29-28)|| 3 ||
|-  style="background:#fbb;"
| 2015-08-|| Loss||align=left| Jeff Kelly || IFMA Royal World Cup U-18 || Bangkok, Thailand || Decision || 3 ||
|-
| colspan=9 | Legend:

See also 
	
 WBC Muay Thai Super lightweight title
 2019 IFMA World Muaythai Championships

References

External links 

 Adam Noi at ONE Championship
 

1999 births
Living people
French male kickboxers
Algerian male kickboxers
Bantamweight kickboxers
French Muay Thai practitioners
Sportspeople from Paris
French sportspeople of Algerian descent
ONE Championship kickboxers
Adam Larfi